HR 3082 is a double star in the northern circumpolar constellation of Camelopardalis. It is faintly visible to the naked eye with an apparent visual magnitude of 5.39. The system is moving closer to the Sun with a heliocentric radial velocity of +2.7 km/s.

The brighter component is a magnetic, mild Ap star that displays an overabundance of silicon in its spectrum. Cowley et al. (1969) listed a stellar classification of A0p Si, while Abt and Morrell (1995) have it pegged as a subgiant star with a class of B9.5 IVs. It has an estimated 2.65 times the mass of the Sun and 2.89 times the Sun's radius. The star is radiating 74 times the Sun's luminosity from its photosphere at an effective temperature of 10,795 K.

The fainter component is a magnitude 9.6 star at an angular separation of  along a position angle (PA) of 84°, as of 2009. This is most likely a visual companion located along the same line of sight. There is a magnitude 13.6 visual companion at a separation of  along a PA of 169°, as of 2016.

References

Ap stars
Double stars
Camelopardalis (constellation)
Durchmusterung objects
064486
039538
3082